The 1912–13 FA Cup was the 42nd season of the world's oldest association football competition, the Football Association Challenge Cup (more usually known as the FA Cup). Aston Villa won the competition for the fifth time, beating Sunderland 1–0 in the final at Crystal Palace, London. Villa's triumph ended a series of new FA Cup winners which had occurred since 1909.

Calendar
The format of the FA Cup for the season had two preliminary rounds, five qualifying rounds, four proper rounds, and the semi finals and final.

First round proper

Source:

+ Match played at neutral venue

Second round proper
15 of the 16 second-round matches were played on Saturday 1 February 1913. Four matches were drawn, with the replays taking place in the following midweek . One of these went to a second replay the following week.

+ match played at neutral venue

Third round proper
The eight third-round matches were played on Saturday 22 February 1913. There were two replays, played in the following midweek.

Fourth round proper
The four fourth-round (quarter-final) matches were played on 8 March 1913. There was one replay, the Tyne-Wear derby between Newcastle United and Sunderland, played on 12 March. This went to a second replay, which Sunderland won.

Semi-finals

The semi-finals were played on 29 March 1913. The Burnley–Sunderland match went to a replay, which Sunderland won, going on to meet Aston Villa in the final.

Replay

Final

The final was contested by Aston Villa and Sunderland on 19 April 1913 at London's Crystal Palace. Aston Villa won 1–0, with a goal by Tommy Barber assisted by a crossed ball from Charlie Wallace. Wallace had earlier missed a penalty, something that would not occur again in FA Cup Final, until the 1988 final between Wimbledon and Liverpool.

Match details

References

1912-13
FA
Cup